The United Planters’ Association of Southern India, known as UPASI, is an apex association of planters of tea, coffee, rubber, cardamom and pepper in the South Indian states of Karnataka, Tamil Nadu, and Kerala. Established in 1893, The United Planters’ Association of Southern India catered to the needs of the plantation sector in south India. The UPASI Secretariat is located at Coonoor in The Nilgiris, Tamil Nadu. UPASI also operates a Tea Research Foundation that focus on scientific research pertaining to cultivation, production and processing of tea and other allied aspects.

History 
The United Planters' Association of Southern India was founded on 28 August 1893 as a federation of the 13 district planters associations which had been founded earlier in the planting regions of the then Madras Presidency, princely states of Mysore, Cochin, Travancore and Coorg - an area directly administered by the Government of India. Activities of UPASI encompasses areas such as, research, advisory, labour welfare, settlements with trade unions and liaisoning with the government. UPASI established a Tea Experimental Station at Davershola (Gudalur, The Nilgiris, Tamil Nadu) in 1927 which was later become the Tea Research Foundation (TRF). At present, the UPASI Tea Research Foundation comprises the Tea Research Institute at Valparai and its six Regional Centres at Coonoor, Gudalur, Koppa, Munnar, Meppadi and Vandiperiyar across the three south Indian states.

Mission 

The primary role of The United Planters' Association of Southern India is to represent the planters’ interests in national and international forums. It is also engaged in scientific research, economic research, statistical analysis, commodity affairs, industrial relations, taxation and finance, land and legal issues.

See also 
Camellia sinensis

Nilgiri tea

Tea Board of India

Coffee Board of India

Rubber Board

Spices Board of India

Indian Tea Association

Tocklai Tea Research Institute

References